The 2008–09 Barako Bull Energy Boosters season is the ninth season of the franchise in the Philippine Basketball Association (PBA).

Key dates
August 30: The 2008 PBA Draft took place in Fort Bonifacio, Taguig.
September 1: The free agency period started.

Draft picks

Roster

Depth chart

Philippine Cup

Elimination round

Standings

Game log

|- bgcolor="#edbebf"
| 1
| October 8
| Purefoods
| 73–77
| Espinas (18)
| Najorda (8)
| Baguio (4)
| Araneta Coliseum
| 0–1
|- bgcolor="#edbebf"
| 2
| October 10
| Rain or Shine
| 90–96
| Cruz (17)
| Espinas (17)
| Baguio (3)
| Cuneta Astrodome
| 0–2
|- bgcolor="#edbebf"
| 3
| October 16
| Alaska
| 83–89
| Rodriguez (19)
| Rodriguez (15)
| Baguio (4)
| JCSGO Gym
| 0–3
|- bgcolor="#bbffbb"
| 4
| October 19
| Ginebra
| 100-94
| Espinas (18)
| Sharma (12)
| Hubalde (5)
| Araneta Coliseum
| 1–3
|- bgcolor="#bbffbb"
| 5
| October 25
| San Miguel
| 114-113
| Baguio (17)
| Espinas (10)
| Cruz, Baguio (5)
| Misamis Oriental
| 2–3
|- bgcolor="#bbffbb"
| 6
| October 29
| Talk 'N Text
| 104-102
| Baguio, Espinas (20)
| Rodriguez, Espinas (6)
| Cruz, Espinas, Duncil (4)
| Araneta Coliseum
| 3–3

|- bgcolor="#edbebf"
| 7
| November 2
| Coca-Cola
| 92–97
| Rodriguez (15)
| Espinas (12)
| Najorda, Duncil, Hubalde (3)
| Araneta Coliseum
| 3–4
|- bgcolor="#edbebf"
| 8
| November 9
| Sta. Lucia
| 80–83
| Espinas (20)
| Espinas (13)
| Cruz (4)
| Cuneta Astrodome
| 3–5
|- bgcolor="#edbebf"
| 9
| November 14
| Purefoods
| 72–80
| Espinas (21)
| Espinas (9)
| Baguio, Chan (3)
| Ynares Center
| 3–6
|- bgcolor="#edbebf"
| 10
| November 16
| Talk 'N Text
| 93–103
| Cruz (15)
| Espinas (11)
| Sharma, Duncil (4)
| Cuneta Astrodome
| 3–7
|- bgcolor="#edbebf"
| 11
| November 21
| Air21
| 89–92
| Baguio (18)
| Rodriguez (11)
| Baguio (5)
| araneta Coliseum
| 3–8
|- bgcolor="#edbebf"
| 12
| November 28
| Rain or Shine
| 92–100
| Sharma (18)
| Sharma (12)
| Baguio (5)
| Ynares Center
| 3–9

|- bgcolor="#edbebf"
| 13
| December 3
| Ginebra
| 76–83
| Baguio (16)
| Holper, Cruz (9)
| Hubalde (3)
| Araneta Coliseum
| 3–10
|- bgcolor="#edbebf"
| 14
| December 6
| San Miguel
| 84–89
| Espinas (14)
| Espinas (11)
| Baguio (5)
| Cuneta Astrodome
| 3–11
|- bgcolor="#bbffbb"
| 15
| December 10
| Alaska
| 100-80
| Chan (23)
| Holper (10)
| Ybañez (5)
| Araneta Coliseum
| 4–11
|- bgcolor="#bbffbb"
| 16
| December 12
| Air21
| 98-88
| Sharma (22)
| Rodriguez (9)
| Ybañez (5)
| Araneta Coliseum
| 5–11
|- bgcolor="#edbebf"
| 17
| December 19
| Coca-Cola
| 86–88
| Baguio (15)
| Sharma (10)
| Cruz (5)
| Ynares Center
| 5–12
|- bgcolor="#edbebf"
| 18
| December 21
| Sta. Lucia
| 98–102
| Chan (23)
| Espinas (12)
| Baguio (5)
| Cuneta Astrodome
| 5–13

Awards and records

Awards

Records
Note: Red Bull Barako Records Only

Transactions

Trades

Free agents

Additions

Subtractions

References

Barako Bull Energy Boosters seasons
Barako Bull